In the early 1980s  the British Air Racing Championship was developed with the reformation of the Royal Aero Club Competition Committee into the Royal Aero Club Records Racing and Rally Association (3R), allocating points according to position in the field at the finish of each air race, accumulating throughout a racing season.

History
As soon as aircraft developed to the stage that they would stay airborne for predictable amounts of time, pilots started to pit their skills and aircraft against each other both personally and on a national and international basis. The earliest air races attracted an international audience and large cash prizes were offered for the winners.  Perhaps the epitome of this would be the  Schneider Trophy.
As aircraft became more diverse, handicapping was adopted in Britain to level the playing field. The first handicapped race was held in 1922, sponsored by King George V—the King’s Cup.  In 1931 the rules were re-written to allow amateur pilots to compete in standard production aircraft. Those rules still apply today, with some minor modifications and the King’s Cup remains the only air race to receive royal patronage.

Handicapped air racing was a British phenomenon, although latterly the concept has been used to stage air races worldwide.

Racing season

A typical handicapped air racing season comprises some eight venues and 16 races: the maximum points available for a win in each race is 100 on a sliding scale.
The British Air Racing Champion is the winner of this cumulative championship.

Since 1952, the annual British Air-Racing Champion has been awarded the Jubilee Trophy: a silver cup. 

The runner-up is awarded the Brian McBride Trophy: a silver bowl on a wooden plinth.

The annual Champion Navigator is awarded the Gaelic Hunter Trophy: a figure of a Gaelic hunter with his dog.

British Air-Racing Champions
The following were the winners of the Jubilee Trophy and the Champion of the year:

 1952: WPI Fillingham
 1953: Sqn Ldr James Rush AFC
 1954: Miss Freydis Leaf
 1955: J Nat Somers AFC
 1956: Flt Lieut H Brian Iles
 1957: Flt Lieut H Brian Iles
 1958: Hugh AG Smith
 1959: Capt NT Baldwick AAC
 1960: Sqn Ldr J DeM Severne
 1961: SM Aarons
 1962: Dennis Hartas
 1963: Paul G Bannister
 1964: Dennis Hartas
 1965: P Blamire
 1966: John AC Miles
 1967: John Stewart-Wood
 1968: RL Ranscombe
 1969: Charles BG Masefield
 1970: John Stewart-Wood
 1971: FB Miles
 1972: Frederick Marsh
 1973: Jan Behrman
 1974: Jan Behrman
 1975: Jan Behrman
 1976: AJ Spiller
 1977: F Pursglove
 1978: R Hayter
 1979: Jeremy Smith
 1980: R Graves
 1981: Jeremy Smith
 1982: John Stewart-Wood
 1983: Flt Lieut D Turner
 1984: Dr Ian Dalziel
 1985: GSI Hanks
 1986: FB Miles
 1987: Peter W Crispe
 1988: KJ Wilson
 1989: Andrew Brinkley
 1990: Spencer Flack
 1991: Derek Simpson
 1992: Bruce Hook
 1993: Sqn Ldr Mike Baker
 1994: Bruce Hook
 1995: Bob Willies
 1996: Sqn Ldr Alan Austin MBE
 1997: Paul Moorhead
 1998: Bert Miles
 1999: Graham J Banfield
 2000: Robert Miller
 2001: Milan Konstantinovic
 2001: Ivan H Seach-Allen
 2002: Phil Wadsworth
 2003: Robert Miller
 2004: John Kelsall
 2005: Craig Beevers
 2006: Anthony P Beynon
 2007: Rob Callaway-Lewis
 2008: Alistair Allan
 2009: Craig Beevers
 2010: Neil Cooper
 2011: Geoffrey Boot
 2012: Gordon Bellerby
 2013: Martin Gosling
 2014: Martin Gosling
 2015: Bob Ellis
 2016: Mark Turner & Joanne Turner
 2017: Dominic Crossan
 2018: Simon Tilling & Emma Taylor
 2019: Jonathan Willis

References

Air racing